Khalid Mahmood is the 5th Emir of Jamaat-e-Islami Kashmir. He was elected in June 2017 and took his oath of office on 16 July 2017 in Islamabad.

Background
He comes from Rehara, a village in the city of Rawalakot, Azad Kashmir, Pakistan. He was formerly district ameer and naib ameer of JI Azad Jammu and Kashmir and Gilgit-Baltistan. He was a member of Islami Jamiat-e-Talaba and president of Chandka Medical College in Sindh, Pakistan. He is by profession a physician and runs a clinic named Rawalakot Hospital.

Early life and education
He was born on 1956 in the village of Rehara, Rawalakot Azad Kashmir. He went to government Sabir Shaheed Pilot High school rawalakot. After matriculation he Joined government degree college Rawalakot. He went to chandka medical college sindh for MBBS. He was the President of Islami Jamiat-e-Talaba in Chandka Medical college sindh

References

Jamaat-e-Islami Pakistan politicians

Year of birth missing (living people)
Living people